Publius Plautius Hupsaeus (Hypsaeus) was a politician of the Roman Republic.

Praetor and ally of Pompey, Hypsaeus was later tried under Pompey's retroactive laws on violence and corruption (52 BC) for bribery. In 53 BC he was a candidate for the consular position, against Milo. Hypsaeus' gangs were reinforced by Clodius and fights broke out between the competing parties.

References

Plautius Hypsaeus Publius
1st-century BC Romans
Plautii